Scott Peterson (born 1972) is an American salesman, who was convicted of the murder of his wife Laci.

Scott Peterson may also refer to:

 Scott Peterson (writer) (born c. 1966), staff writer for The Christian Science Monitor
 Scott Peterson (comics) (born 1968), comic book writer and editor
 Scot Peterson (police officer), former school resource officer who was arrested for his inaction during the 2018 Stoneman Douglas High School shooting
 Scott Peterson (died 1994), an American professional wrestler, a founding member of the Southern Rockers tag team.

See also 

 Scott Petersen (disambiguation)